Ira Kenneth Reiner (born February 15, 1936) is an American attorney and politician who served as the Los Angeles City Attorney from 1981 to 1984 and Los Angeles County District Attorney from 1984 to 1992. The McMartin preschool trial occurred during his tenure as DA.

Education 
Reiner earned a Bachelor of Science degree from the University of Southern California and a Juris Doctor from the Southwestern Law School in 1964.

Career 
He was the Los Angeles city controller from 1977 to 1981, and was the Los Angeles city attorney from 1981 to 1984, both times being succeeded by James Hahn. He was the Los Angeles County District Attorney from 1984 to 1992. As district attorney, he supervised the prosecution of several notorious cases, including the murder trial of Richard Ramírez, the widely publicized police arrest of Rodney King, and the McMartin preschool trial, the best known case of day care sex abuse hysteria.

In 1990, Reiner was an unsuccessful candidate for the Democratic nomination for California attorney general, losing to San Francisco District Attorney Arlo Smith, who in turn was defeated by Republican former Congressman Dan Lungren. In 1992, Reiner sought re-election as district attorney, but trailed Gil Garcetti in the June non-partisan primary. Initially Reiner stayed in the race, but in September he dropped out.

After retirement from office he entered private practice with the firm Riley and Reiner.

See also
 Bob Ronka, Los Angeles City Council member, 1977–81, candidate opposite Ira Reiner in 1981

References

1936 births
Living people
California Democrats
District attorneys in California
Los Angeles City Attorneys
Los Angeles City Controllers
Southwestern Law School alumni
University of Southern California alumni
Jewish American people in California politics
21st-century American Jews